Barbora Krejčíková and Kateřina Siniaková defeated Beatriz Haddad Maia and Laura Siegemund in the final, 6–1, 6–7(3–7), [10–7], to win the women's doubles tennis title at the 2023 Indian Wells Masters. It was their first title at Indian Wells, third WTA 1000 title, and 15th career WTA Tour doubles title together.

Xu Yifan and Yang Zhaoxuan were the defending champions, but lost in the first round to Alexa Guarachi and Erin Routliffe.

Seeds

Draw

Finals

Top half

Bottom half

Seeded teams
The following are the seeded teams, based on WTA rankings as of February 27, 2023.

Other entry information

Wildcards

Alternates

Withdrawals
  Caroline Dolehide /  Madison Keys → replaced by  Belinda Bencic /  Jil Teichmann

References

External links
 Main draw

BNP Paribas Open – Women's doubles
Doubles women